Andrew James Lewis  (born 24 January 1983) is a retired British paratriathlete. Lewis is one of Britain's most successful PT2 paratriathletes, winning gold medals at European, world and Paralympic levels.

Background 
As a youngster, Lewis competed for Gloucestershire as a cross-country runner. At the age of 16 he was involved in a motorcycle accident, which eventually resulted in a through the knee amputation in his right leg when he was 22.

Career 
Lewis took up paratriathlon in 2013, competing in the men's PT2 category from 2014. In August 2014 he won the British Paratriathlon National Championships. His first major title came in May 2016, when he finished in first place at the ETU Triathlon European Championships, in Lisbon. In July of the same year he took the gold medal at the Paratriathlon World Championships in Rotterdam, before also going on to take gold at the 2016 Paralympics in Rio.

Lewis was awarded an MBE for services to triathlon, in the 2017 New Year Honours list.

In 2020 Lewis retired from competitive paratriathlon to launch a mental health business.

Personal life 
Lewis lives in Whitecroft, in the Forest of Dean, Gloucestershire, with his wife and two children.

References

External links 
 
 
 

1983 births
Living people
British male triathletes
Paratriathletes of Great Britain
Paralympic medalists in paratriathlon
Paralympic gold medalists for Great Britain
Paratriathletes at the 2016 Summer Paralympics
Medalists at the 2016 Summer Paralympics
People from Lydney
Members of the Order of the British Empire